The Notre Dame Fighting Irish women's basketball team is the intercollegiate women's basketball program representing University of Notre Dame in South Bend, Indiana. The program currently competes in the Atlantic Coast Conference of NCAA Division I. The Fighting Irish play their home games in the Purcell Pavilion at the Edmund P. Joyce Center, and are currently coached by Niele Ivey.

History
Former coach Muffet McGraw was the women's head coach from 1987 to 2020 and led the Irish to two National Championships in 2001 and 2018. The Irish's first national championship team in 2001 was led by 6-foot-5 center and future WNBA star Ruth Riley, who led the Irish past Purdue 68–66. 

Under McGraw's stewardship, Notre Dame has reached the Final Four nine times (1997, 2001, 2011, 2012, 2013, 2014, 2015, 2018 and 2019), which currently ranks 5th all time in NCAA history. Notre Dame has made it to the Sweet Sixteen in each of the last ten seasons (2010–19), has won 20 or more games in 24 of the past 25 seasons, and has won 30 or more games in eight consecutive seasons (2011–19). The Irish have made 26 NCAA tournament appearances as of the end of the 2018–19 season, including a current streak of 24 appearances. In the current streak, Notre Dame has made it to the second round in all but one of the appearances.

McGraw would take the Fighting Irish back to the Final Four in 2011 under the play of star point guard Skylar Diggins, beating Pat Summitt's Tennessee Lady Volunteers; the program's first win against the Lady Vols in 21 tries. That win was followed by an upset of the number one-ranked UConn Huskies (making Notre Dame the first team ever to beat both Tennessee and UConn in the same tournament) to advance the Fighting Irish to the 2011 championship game, where it lost to Texas A&M.  The Irish would return to the championship game in 2012, losing to unbeaten Baylor after winning the Big East regular season title and beating UConn again to reach the final.

In the 2012–2013 season, the Irish, led by Diggins and shooting guard Kayla McBride, posted their best regular season record in school history (31–1), despite losing Big East defensive player of the year Devereaux Peters and two other starters to graduation. Their only regular season loss was to Baylor, and the team posted wins over #9 Tennessee in Knoxville and a narrow 1 point at #1 Connecticut. The Irish completed an undefeated 16–0 Big East regular season championship vs #3 Connecticut in the final game of the season, winning a triple overtime thriller to close out Diggins’ career in South Bend. UConn and Notre Dame would again meet in the Big East Tournament final, with Notre Dame winning narrowly 61–59 to claim their first ever Big East tournament championship. Notre Dame had lost to UConn in the finale 6 previous times.

Notre Dame made it to the national championship game in 2014 and 2015, twice losing to Connecticut.

After an injury plagued start to the 2017–18 season, which saw four Irish players lost to injury, Notre Dame won its second National Championship by beating Mississippi State 61–58. Junior guard Arike Ogunbowale scored the game winning three point shot with one-tenth of a second left, two days after scoring a similar buzzer beater to knock out Connecticut in the semifinal game. The win was coach McGraw's second national championship and 800th win at Notre Dame. Four of the returning five starters, including Ogunbowale, Jackie Young, Marina Mabrey and Jessica Shepard, returned to the Final Four the following year. The Irish would beat Uconn 81–76 before falling by 1 point to Baylor, 82–81.

The Irish are now coached under former player and star Niele Ivey, who in her third season has led the team to an ACC regular season conference championship and a trip to the sweet sixteen.

Awards and honors

National awards

Players

Naismith College Player of the Year
 Ruth Riley – 2001
AP National Player of the Year
 Ruth Riley – 2001
Sports Illustrated National Player of the Year
 Ruth Riley – 2001
NCAA basketball tournament Most Outstanding Player
 Ruth Riley – 2001
 Arike Ogunbowale – 2018
Nancy Lieberman Award
 Skylar Diggins – 2012, 2013
Elite 90 Award
 Nicole Benz – 2019

Coaches

Naismith College Coach of the Year
 Muffet McGraw – 2001, 2013, 2014
AP Coach of the Year
 Muffet McGraw – 2001, 2013, 2014, 2018
WBCA Coach of the Year
 Muffet McGraw – 2001, 2013, 2014
USBWA Coach of the Year
 Muffet McGraw – 2001, 2013, 2014

Conference awards

Players

ACC Athlete of the Year
 Arike Ogunbowale – 2018

ACC Player of the Year
 Kayla McBride – 2014
 Jewell Loyd – 2015
 Brianna Turner – 2016

ACC Defensive Player of the Year
 Brianna Turner – 2016, 2017, 2019 

ACC Rookie of the Year
 Brianna Turner – 2015
 Maddy Westbeld - 2021
 Sonja Citron - 2022

Big East Player of the Year
Ruth Riley – 2001
Jacqueline Batteast – 2005
Skylar Diggins – 2012, 2013

Big East Freshman of the Year
Alicia Ratay – 2000
Jacqueline Batteast – 2002
Jewell Loyd – 2013

Big East Defensive Player of the Year
Ruth Riley – 1999, 2000, 2001
Devereaux Peters – 2011, 2012

Midwestern Collegiate Conference/Horizon League Player of the Year
Karen Robinson – 1990, 1991

North Star Conference Player of the Year
 Trena Keys – 1985, 1986

Coaches

ACC Coach of the Year
Muffet McGraw – 2014, 2016
Niele Ivey - 2022

Big East Coach of the Year
Muffet McGraw – 2001, 2013

Midwestern Collegiate Conference/Horizon League Coach of the Year
Muffet McGraw – 1991

North Star Conference Coach of the Year
Mary DiStanislao – 1985, 1986
Muffet McGraw – 1988

Season-by-season results

NCAA Tournament history
Notre Dame has played in 27 NCAA Tournaments with a record of 69–25.

References

External links